Ángel Ernesto Pacheco Romero is a Cuban Greco-Roman wrestler. At the 2020 Pan American Wrestling Championships held in Ottawa, Canada he won the gold medal in the 130 kg event. A year earlier, he won one of the bronze medals in this event.

In March 2020, he competed in the 2020 Pan American Wrestling Olympic Qualification Tournament without qualifying for the 2020 Summer Olympics.

Achievements

References

External links 
 

Living people
Year of birth missing (living people)
Place of birth missing (living people)
Cuban male sport wrestlers
Pan American Wrestling Championships medalists
21st-century Cuban people